Twiggy's Jukebox was a weekly rock music TV series seen throughout the United States during the 1978-1979 television season. It took musical performances were from the 1975-1976 British series Supersonic and recut them with content featuring host Twiggy. The program was distributed by American International Television (AITV) to local stations throughout the U.S. After one year, Twiggy left the series, and AITV restructured the property into a notably different program, titled Jukebox and starring Britt Ekland introducing standard music videos.  The Ekland version of the series lasted only the 1979–1980 season. 26 total episodes were produced. It was produced by Paul Flattery and directed by Bruce Gowers for Jon Roseman Productions International.

References
 

1978 American television series debuts
1979 American television series endings
1970s American television series
Television series by MGM Television